Uri Tzaig (born 1965) is an Israeli artist.
  
Tzaig was born in Qiryat Gat.  Tzaig, who has a background in theater, works often in multimedia, video, and installations.  In 1992, Tzaig graduated from the “School of Visual Theater” in Jerusalem.  His installations have appeared at the Centre Georges Pompidou, MASS MoCA, and other major international museums.  He currently lives in Israel.

In 2008 Tzaig was appointed as headmaster of the textile design faculty in the Shenkar College of Engineering and Design.

References

1965 births
Israeli artists
Living people
Date of birth missing (living people)